Jonathan Koch is the president and chief creative officer of Asylum Entertainment, a Los Angeles-based television production company that produced the 2011 miniseries The Kennedys. In 2004, Koch co-authored Pitching Hollywood: How to Sell Your TV Show and Movie Ideas, a film and television pitching manual, with Robert Kosberg. In 2016, Koch received a hand transplant.

Selected filmography 
 Beyond the Glory (2001-2006)
 American Gangster (2006-2009)
 The Locator (2008-2010)
 Addicted  (2010-2012)
 The Kennedys (2011)
 Urban Tarzan (2013)
 Ring of Fire (2013)
 Beverly Hills Pawn (2013-2015)
 ESPN 30 for 30 - The Price of Gold (2014)
 Small Time (2014)
 Happy Valley (2014)
 The Secret Life of Marilyn Monroe (2015)
 The Kennedys After Camelot (2017)

Hand transplant 
In 2015, Koch became gravely ill and was hospitalized. On January 26, 2015, at the Realscreen Summit in Washington, D.C., Koch went to George Washington University Hospital with a 102 degree temperature and 2 days later, was put into a propofol-induced coma. The following day, Koch was in full-blown septic shock and his hands and feet were turning blue. Koch's hands and feet became necrotic, and he eventually lost the bottom part of his right leg, parts of his fingers on his right hand, and all of his toes. In April 2015, after delaying the amputation of his left hand, Koch returned to Los Angeles and met UCLA's Dr. Kodi Azari, who was heading up hand transplant trials. In October 2016, Jonathan received a call that a donor was available and underwent a 17-hour hand transplant surgery.

References

External links 
Jonathan Koch at the Internet Movie Database
Jonathan Koch at Key Speakers Bureau

Living people
Year of birth missing (living people)
American television producers
Hand transplant recipients
American amputees